R375 road may refer to:
 R375 road (Ireland)
 R375 road (South Africa)